Summertime Dream is Canadian singer Gordon Lightfoot's twelfth original album, released on the Reprise Records label in 1976. It peaked at #1 on the Canadian RPM national album chart, and #12 on the US Billboard pop chart.

The album marked Lightfoot's commercial zenith in a remarkable period of popularity which had begun with the 1970 hit, "If You Could Read My Mind". He has not since achieved the same level of commercial success.

The album shot to popularity on the back of the haunting ballad, "The Wreck of the Edmund Fitzgerald", which told the story of the final hours of SS Edmund Fitzgerald which had sunk on Lake Superior in November 1975. The song remains popular to this day and has been credited with making the sinking of Edmund Fitzgerald the most famous maritime incident in the history of the Great Lakes.

"The Wreck of the Edmund Fitzgerald" reached #1 in Canada on November 20, 1976. In the US, it peaked at #2 on the pop chart and #50 on the country chart while "Race Among the Ruins" peaked at #65 on the pop chart.

Track listing
All songs composed by Gordon Lightfoot.

Side 1
"Race Among the Ruins" – 3:21
"The Wreck of the Edmund Fitzgerald" – 6:30
"I'm Not Supposed to Care" – 3:31
"I'd Do It Again" – 3:14
"Never Too Close" – 3:04
"Betty Called Me In" – 2:39 (1999 release bonus)

Side 2
"Protocol" – 4:02
"The House You Live In" – 2:55
"Summertime Dream" – 2:30
"Spanish Moss" – 3:51
"Too Many Clues in This Room" – 4:49

Chart performance

Weekly charts

Year-end charts

Personnel
Gordon Lightfoot - vocals, 6- and 12-string guitars
Terry Clements - lead acoustic and electric guitars
Pee Wee Charles - pedal steel guitar
Rick Haynes - bass guitar
Barry Keane - drums, percussion
Additional personnel
Gene Martynec - Moog synthesizer
Jim Gordon - drums on "The House You Live In"

References

External links
Album lyrics and chords

Gordon Lightfoot albums
1976 albums
Albums produced by Lenny Waronker
Reprise Records albums